Perrierodendron is a genus of trees and shrubs in the family Sarcolaenaceae. They are endemic to Madagascar.

The genus name of Perrierodendron is in honour of Joseph Marie Henry Alfred Perrier de la Bâthie (1873–1958), a French botanist who specialized in the plants of Madagascar. It was first described and published in Bull. Mus. Natl. Hist. Nat., séries 2, Vol.23 on page 138 in 1951.

Species 
The genus includes the following species:
 Perrierodendron boinense  
 Perrierodendron capuronii  
 Perrierodendron occidentale  
 Perrierodendron quartzitorum  
 Perrierodendron rodoense

References

Sarcolaenaceae
Malvales genera
Plants described in 1951
Endemic flora of Madagascar